Riedelia may refer to:
 Riedelia (plant)
 Riedelia (fly)
 Riedelia (gastropod)
 Riedelia (diatom)